Miramar Futsal Clube was a Portuguese futsal club from Gulpilhares, Vila Nova de Gaia. Founded in 1991 the club won two Portuguese Futsal Leagues and competed on the last edition of the Futsal European Clubs Championship. The team was dissolved after the 2007–08 season.

Club honours

National competitions
 Liga Portuguesa de Futsal (2): 1996–97, 1999–2000
 Taça de Portugal de Futsal: 1997–98
 Supertaça de Futsal: 2000

Former players

References

External links
 Miramar official blog
 Miramar in zerozero.pt

Futsal clubs in Portugal
Futsal clubs established in 1991
1991 establishments in Portugal
2008 disestablishments in Portugal